There are three species of lizard named spotted dwarf gecko:
 Hemiphyllodactylus bintik
 Lygodactylus ocellatus
 Lepidoblepharis hoogmoedi